Mercyhurst Ice Center is a 35,280 square foot, 1,500-seat hockey rink in Erie, Pennsylvania, United States. It is home to the Mercyhurst University Lakers Men's and Women's ice hockey teams. The center was the first privately funded ice rink in Erie when it opened on 8 December 1991. The school expects to retire its 30-year construction bond through the assessment of a student fee, which produces $80,000 annually.

Lakers Men's Team 

The Lakers men's ice hockey team currently competes in Division I Atlantic Hockey. Prior to 1991, the Lakers were known as The Boys on the Bus because they had to shuttle by bus to local civic ice rinks for events. Their determination and competitiveness encouraged the school to build the new center. The arena was the site of the 1995 NCAA Men's Division II Ice Hockey Championship.

Laker's Women's Team 

Lakers women's ice hockey has been played at the center since the team formed in 1999. The women, who play in the College Hockey America league, reached the 2007 NCAA Frozen Four as #2 seed. Their overtime loss to Duluth in quarterfinal play at the Ice Center on 9 March 2007 left the Lakers with a 32-2-3 season record.

General Uses 
The Ice Center hosts local youth and high school hockey programs, as well as recreational skating for Mercyhurst students.

See also
Mercyhurst University

External links
Lakers Women's Ice Hockey
Mercyhurst College Virtual Campus Tour - Ice Center

 

Indoor arenas in Pennsylvania
College ice hockey venues in the United States
Sports venues in Pennsylvania
Indoor ice hockey venues in the United States
Mercyhurst Lakers ice hockey